St. Elizabeth's flood (Sint Elisabethsvloed) may refer to floods that struck Europe's Low Countries
on or around November 19, the name day of St. Elizabeth:

 St. Elizabeth's flood (1404)
 St. Elizabeth's flood (1421)